Rong Zhu (ch: 茸主; born March 7, 2000) is a Chinese mixed martial artist who competed in the Lightweight division of the Ultimate Fighting Championship.

Background
Of Tibetan descent, as early as the age of 12, Rong began to practice Sanda. After three years of hard training, he did not achieve excellent results, realizing that this path might not be suitable for him, Zhu decided to switch sports and after seeing MMA on TV, and was instantly attracted by the sport. Later, after being introduced by his uncle, Zhu started training at Enbo Fight Club as an assistant and sparring partner for Su Mudaerji, where his duties included tasks such as carrying towels and water.

Mixed martial arts career

Early career
Having his first pro fight just days after his 16th birthday in 2016, Rong compiled a 17–3 record on the Chinese regional scene, most off it with the promotion WLF, where he captured the Lightweight title and defended it three times.

Ultimate Fighting Championship
Rong made his UFC debut against Kazula Vargas at UFC 261 on April 24, 2021. He lost the fight via unanimous decision.

For his second fight in the UFC, Rong was initially scheduled to face Dakota Bush on September 18, 2021, at UFC Fight Night: Smith vs. Spann. However, Bush tested positive for COVID-19 during fight week and was replaced by Brandon Jenkins. At the weigh-ins, Rong weighed in at 158 pounds, two pounds over the lightweight non-title fight limit. The bout proceeded at a catchweight and he forfeited 20% of his purse to his opponent. He won the fight via technical knockout in round three.

Rong faced Ignacio Bahamondes at UFC Fight Night: Makhachev vs. Green on February 26, 2022. At the weigh-ins, Rong weighed in at 160 pounds, 4 pounds over the lightweight non-title fight limit. It was the second straight fight in which he had missed weight. His bout proceeded at a catchweight and he was fined 40% of his purse, which went to Bahamondes. He lost the bout via third round submission.

In May 2022, it was reported that Rong was released by the UFC.

Post UFC 
In his first appearance post-release, Rong faced Felipe Maia on October 20, 2022, at UAE Warriors 34. He won the bout via TKO in the second round.

Championships and accomplishments
Wu Lin Feng
WLF Lightweight Championship (One time)
Three successful title defenses

Mixed martial arts record

|-
|Win
|align=center|22–5
|Felipe Maia
|TKO (punches)
|UAE Warriors 34
|
|align=center|2
|align=center|1:59
|Abu Dhabi, United Arab Emirates
|
|-
|Loss
|align=center|21–5
|Ignacio Bahamondes
|Submission (brabo choke)
|UFC Fight Night: Makhachev vs. Green
|
|align=center|3
|align=center|1:40
|Las Vegas, Nevada, United States
|
|-
|Win
|align=center|21–4
|Brandon Jenkins
|TKO (punches)
|UFC Fight Night: Smith vs. Spann 
|
|align=center|3
|align=center|4:35
|Las Vegas, Nevada, United States
|
|-
|Loss
|align=center|20–4
|Kazula Vargas
|Decision (unanimous)
|UFC 261
|
|align=center| 3
|align=center| 5:00
|Jacksonville, Florida, United States
|
|-
|Win
|align=center| 20–3
|Deliya Bi
|TKO (punches)
|WLF W.A.R.S. 50
|
|align=center|3
|align=center|4:16
|Zhengzhou, China
|
|-
|Win
|align=center| 19–3
|Shayilan Nuerdanbieke
|KO (punches)
|WLF W.A.R.S. 47
|
|align=center|1
|align=center|2:05
|Zhengzhou, China
|
|-
|Win
|align=center| 18–3
|Jiaqiang Han
|Submission (arm-triangle choke)
|WLF W.A.R.S. 46
|
|align=center|1
|align=center|2:01
|Zhengzhou, China
|
|-
|Win
|align=center|17–3
|Huwanixi Wusikenbieke
|KO (punches)
|WLF W.A.R.S. 43
|
|align=center|1
|align=center|1:47
|Zhengzhou, China
|
|-
|Win
|align=center| 16–3
|Alisson Barbosa
|Decision (unanimous)
|WLF W.A.R.S. 39
|
|align=center|5
|align=center|5:00
|Zhengzhou, China
|
|-
|Win
|align=center| 15–3
|Mohsen Mohammadseifi
|KO (punches)
|WLF W.A.R.S. 35
|
|align=center|1
|align=center|2:50
|Zhengzhou, China
|
|-
|Win
|align=center| 14–3
|Marcio Andrade
|Submission (rear-naked choke)
|WLF W.A.R.S. 31
|
|align=center|5
|align=center|3:49
|Zhengzhou, China
|
|-
|Win
|align=center| 13–3
|Nikoloz Kajaia
|Submission (guillotine choke)
|WLF W.A.R.S. 27
|
|align=center|2
|align=center|3:47
|Zhengzhou, China
|
|-
|Win
|align=center| 12–3
|Arben Escayo
|TKO (injury)
|ABA Fighting Championship: Hongyuan
|
|align=center| 1
|align=center| 1:39
|Hongyuan County, China
|
|-
|Win
|align=center| 11–3
|Aleko Sagliani
|TKO (retirement)
|WLF W.A.R.S. 25
|
|align=center| 2
|align=center| 2:55
|Zhengzhou, China
|
|-
|Win
|align=center|10–3
|Arsen Balyants
|TKO (elbows and punches)
|WLF W.A.R.S. 23
|
|align=center|3
|align=center|0:55
|Zhengzhou, China
|  
|-
|Loss
|align=center|9–3
|Guilherme Cadena
|Submission (triangle choke)
|WLF W.A.R.S. 21
|
|align=center|1
|align=center|3:32
|Zhengzhou, China
|
|-
|Win
|align=center| 9–2
|Takuma Watanabe
|TKO (punches)
|WLF W.A.R.S. 18
|
|align=center| 1
|align=center| 3:42
|Maerkang, China
|
|-
|Win
|align=center| 8–2
|Vincenzo Tagliamonte
|TKO (punches)
|WLF W.A.R.S. 17
|
|align=center| 1
|align=center| 4:44
|Zhengzhou, China
|
|-
|Win
|align=center| 7–2
|Ruslan Khairulin
|TKO (punches)
|WLF W.A.R.S. 15
|
|align=center| 2
|align=center| 4:02
|Zhengzhou, China
|
|-
|Loss
|align=center| 6–2
|Wuliji Buren
|Submission (rear-naked choke)
|Chin Woo Men: 2016-2017 Season, Stage 6
|
|align=center| 1
|align=center| 1:37
|Guangzhou, China
| 
|-
|Win
|align=center| 6–1
|Shanati Shamaiti
|Decision (unanimous)
|Chin Woo Men: 2016-2017 Season, Stage 5
|
|align=center|3
|align=center|5:00
|Guangzhou, China
|
|-
|Win
|align=center| 5–1
|Feng Kai Niu
|Submission (armbar)
|Chin Woo Men: 2016-2017 Season, Stage 2
|
|align=center|1
|align=center|1:43
|Zhengzhou, China
|
|-
|Loss
|align=center| 4–1
|Shamil Nasrudinov
|Submission (guillotine choke)
|WLF E.P.I.C. 9
|
|align=center|1
|align=center|4:01
|Zhengzhou, China
|
|-
|Win
|align=center| 4–0
|Semen Galushko
|TKO (punches)
|WLF E.P.I.C. 6
|
|align=center|1
|align=center|2:16
|Zhengzhou, China
|
|-
|Win
|align=center| 3–0
|Andrey Sapa
|Technical Submission (guillotine choke)
|WLF E.P.I.C. 4
|
|align=center|1
|align=center|2:18
|Zhengzhou, China
|
|-
|Win
|align=center| 2–0
|Vadim Hristoforov
|TKO (punches)
|WLF E.P.I.C. 3
|
|align=center|1
|align=center|3:39
|Zhengzhou, China
|
|-
|Win
|align=center|1–0
|Roman Lutsenko
|Disqualification (punches to back of head)
|Bullet Fly FC 4
|
|align=center|2
|align=center|2:06
|Beijing, China
|

See also 
 List of male mixed martial artists

References

External links 
  
 

2000 births
Living people
Chinese male mixed martial artists
Lightweight mixed martial artists
Mixed martial artists utilizing sanshou
Chinese sanshou practitioners
Ultimate Fighting Championship male fighters
Athletes from Sichuan
Tibetan sportspeople